XHPG-FM is a radio station on 92.1 FM in Córdoba, Veracruz. It is owned by Avanradio and operated by Radio Comunicaciones de las Altas Montañas, airing the La Mejor grupera format from MVS Radio.

History
XHPG received its concession on August 26, 1982. It was originally owned by Carmen Fariña González.

In November 2019 operation of the station was sold to Radio Comunicaciones de las Altas Montañas after having been locally run by Atomium Media; the new operators instituted the La Mejor grupera format from MVS Radio on February 10, 2020. The concession itself is held by the Ferráez family of Avanradio.

References

Radio stations in Veracruz
Radio stations established in 1982